The 2016 Western Carolina Catamounts team represented Western Carolina University as a member of the Southern Conference (SoCon) during the 2016 NCAA Division I FCS football season. Led by fifth-year head coach Mark Speir, the Catamounts compiled an overall record of 2–9 with a mark of 1–7 in conference play, tying for eighth place in the SoCon. Western Carolina played their home games at Bob Waters Field at E. J. Whitmire Stadium in Cullowhee, North Carolina.

Schedule

Game summaries

@ East Carolina Pirates

Gardner–Webb

vs. East Tennessee State

The Citadel

Wofford

@ Mercer

@ Samford

Chattanooga

VMI

@ Furman

@ South Carolina

References

Western Carolina
Western Carolina Catamounts football seasons
Western Carolina Catamounts football